Legacy Christian Academy is a private, non-denominational Christian elementary, middle, and college-preparatory school located in Frisco, Texas.  Legacy's upper school (grades 9–12) was named a national blue ribbon school in 2017.

Academics 
Legacy offers both Advanced Placement (AP) courses as well as dual credit courses partnered with John Brown University and LeTourneau University.

AP courses include: calculus, physics, chemistry, biology, Spanish, Latin, studio art, and computer science.  Dual credit courses include: college algebra, survey of calculus, English (composition and literary analysis & research), U.S. history, and computer science.

Athletics 
Legacy Christian Academy is part of the TAPPS 5A grouping. The teams are known as the "Legacy Eagles" and their mascot is Eli the bald eagle (costumed).

Athletics sports and activities include: football, volleyball, cheer, cross-country, basketball (boys & girls), soccer (boys & girls), baseball, softball, tennis (boys & girls), golf (boys & girls), swimming, & track.

References

External links 
 

Christian schools in Texas
High schools in Collin County, Texas
Frisco, Texas
Nondenominational Christian schools in the United States
Private K-12 schools in Texas
Preparatory schools in Texas